Belinda Dermota (born 28 June 1971) is a South African former cricketer who played as a right-arm medium bowler. She appeared in three One Day Internationals for South Africa, all at the 1997 World Cup. She played domestic cricket for Western Province.

References

External links
 
 

1971 births
Living people
South African women cricketers
South Africa women One Day International cricketers
Western Province women cricketers
20th-century South African women
21st-century South African women